L-Acoustics is a French manufacturer of loudspeakers, amplifiers, marketing materials, and signal processing devices. Headquartered in Marcoussis, south of Paris, the company has offices in the United States, United Kingdom and Germany.

History
In September 1984, Dr. Christian Heil, a physicist in the field of elementary particles with an interest in acoustics, created an electro-acoustic engineering firm named C.HEIL.TEA, later to be renamed L-Acoustics. In 1989, the company launched its MTD115, a coaxial loudspeaker for sound reinforcement use.

In 1992, Heil and his team developed line source array loudspeakers with their V-DOSC system, using the company's Wavefront Sculpture Technology (WST) theory. Based on principles developed by Heil and physicist Professor Marcel Urban, WST defined five criteria for design and use of line source arrays. The WST uses a patented DOSC waveguide, which was the first high-frequency device capable of creating a rectangular, constant-phase planar output.

Although Heil did not invent the underlying theory of the line array, his research and design work ultimately resulted in the V-DOSC system . Today, most professional audio loudspeaker manufacturers have adopted the line array model for their touring systems.

L-Acoustics later introduced other products, including the ARCS Constant Curvature Array (1995), dV-DOSC modular line source (1999), Kudo with K-Louver variable directivity (2005), P Series self-powered coaxials (2006), SB28 subwoofer with laminar vents and LA4 and LA8 amplified controllers (2007). The company also introduced their Soundvision simulation software in 2004, designed to allow system designers to create accurate 3D acoustical models of potential systems using the company's products.

In 2008, 15 years after the launch of V-DOSC, L-Acoustics introduced the K1 system, designed primarily for large festivals and stadium sound reinforcement applications. Distribution of the earliest K1 systems sold was limited to a small number of touring sound companies that agreed to participate in the manufacturer's K1/Kudo Pilot Program, providing feedback to L-Acoustics’ R&D team on its field performance.

In 2010 the manufacturer introduced the Kara and Kara(i) WST line source enclosures, and SB18 and SB18i subwoofers.

The K1 stadium line array system was awarded the top prize for "Indispensable Technology – Audio" at the 10th annual Parnelli Awards ceremony held at the Rio All Suites Hotel & Casino in Las Vegas on October 22, 2010.

In 2014 the K2 received the Prolight + Sound International Press Award.

References

External links
L-Acoustics website

Companies established in 1984
Loudspeaker manufacturers
Manufacturers of professional audio equipment
French brands
Audio equipment manufacturers of France